Ruben Ira Loftus-Cheek (born 23 January 1996) is an English professional footballer who plays as a midfielder for  club Chelsea.

Early life
Loftus-Cheek was born in Lewisham, Greater London. He grew up in Swanley, Kent and attended High Firs Primary School and Orchards Academy. Loftus-Cheek is of Guyanese descent. He is the half-brother, on his father's side, of former professional footballers Carl and Leon Cort. His younger brother, Joe, is a semi-professional footballer.

As a youngster, Loftus-Cheek idolised French internationals Zinedine Zidane and Thierry Henry.

Club career

Chelsea
Loftus-Cheek joined Chelsea at the age of eight. He impressed at the beginning of the 2011–12 season before picking up a hip injury, from which he recovered by the end of the season to make a substitute appearance in the 2012 FA Youth Cup final. In the 2012–13 season, Loftus-Cheek made 18 appearances for the U-18 squad and nine appearances for the U-21 squad, at the end of the season he was rewarded for his good form to travel with a place in the first-team squad for a post season friendly against Manchester City in May 2013. In 2013–14, Loftus-Cheek helped Chelsea win the FA Youth Cup and was a regular for the U21s as they won the Under-21 Premier League.

2014–15 season

Loftus-Cheek made his senior debut for the club on 10 December 2014, replacing Cesc Fàbregas for the final 7 minutes of a UEFA Champions League group match against Sporting CP at Stamford Bridge; Chelsea won 3–1 having already come first in the group. He played his first Premier League match on 31 January 2015, coming on for Oscar in added time at the end of a 1–1 home draw against Manchester City.

On 3 February, Loftus-Cheek was promoted into José Mourinho's first-team squad alongside fellow teenager Izzy Brown.

On 13 April, Loftus-Cheek played for Chelsea in the final of the 2014–15 UEFA Youth League against Shakhtar Donetsk in Switzerland, which ended with a 3–2 victory for Chelsea. On 10 May 2015, Loftus-Cheek was awarded his first start against Liverpool at Stamford Bridge, playing 60 minutes and recording a 100% pass completion record, before being replaced by Nemanja Matić, in a match that ended in a 1–1 draw. Although Loftus-Cheek only made three league appearances out of the whole season, Mourinho stated that he would receive a winner's medal for his contributions this season.

2015–16 season
On 29 August 2015, Loftus-Cheek made his first appearance coming off the bench against Crystal Palace as Chelsea suffered their first home defeat of the season. On 10 January 2016, Loftus-Cheek came on as a half-time substitute for Oscar in an FA Cup match against Scunthorpe United, and scored his first senior goal of his career in the 68th minute of the match, which Chelsea won 2–0. Excluding John Terry, he became the first player to have been at Chelsea since before the age of 15 and score for them since Carlton Cole 10 years and 3 days earlier.

On 29 February 2016, Loftus-Cheek signed a new five-year contract after impressing when given the chance in the first team. He scored his first league goal on 2 April, scoring the opener in a 4–0 win against Aston Villa away. After scoring his first league goal, Loftus-Cheek continued to be in the starting line-up in the following two matches against Swansea City and Manchester City.

2016–17 season

Under new manager, Antonio Conte, Loftus-Cheek was deployed as a striker, playing alongside Diego Costa during preseason. On 23 August 2016, Loftus-Cheek made his first appearance of the season, starting against Bristol Rovers in the Second round of the EFL Cup. He started the build-up of the first goal, as well as providing the assist to the third goal scored by Michy Batshuayi, which turned out to be the winner of a 3–2 victory. He received a standing ovation as he was coming-off for Oscar in the 82nd minute, and was also praised by Conte after the match.

2017–18 season: Loan to Crystal Palace
On 12 July 2017, Loftus-Cheek joined fellow Premier League club Crystal Palace on a season-long loan. He made his debut on the opening day of the season during their 3–0 home defeat against Huddersfield Town, playing for the full 90 minutes. On 25 November 2017, Loftus-Cheek scored his first goal for the London side in a 2–1 victory over Stoke City. Following some impressive form, Loftus-Cheek was rewarded with a senior call-up by manager Gareth Southgate to the England squad for their fixtures against Germany and Brazil in November 2017.

2018–19 season: Return from loan
For the 2018–19 season, Loftus-Cheek was included in the Chelsea first team. On 25 October 2018, he scored a hat-trick in a Europa League home match against BATE Borisov, which ended in a 3–1 win for Chelsea. Three days later, he scored his first league goal of the season away to Burnley. He scored in back-to-back league games in December, against Fulham in a 2–0 home win and Wolverhampton Wanderers in a 2–1 away loss. On 5 May, Loftus-Cheek scored the opener against Watford in a 3–0 home win that eventually secured Champions League football for the following season. In the next match, the second leg of the Europa League semi-final at home to Eintracht Frankfurt, he scored in a 1–1 draw, with Chelsea prevailing 4–3 on penalties. He was ruled out of the final, however, after he suffered an achilles injury during a charity match against New England Revolution.

2019–20 season
On 6 July 2019, Loftus-Cheek agreed a new five-year contract with Chelsea, running until 2024. His injury at the end of the previous season ruled him out of action until June 2020, when the Premier League resumed after the coronavirus lockdown. He made his competitive return to action, starting Chelsea's first match back against Aston Villa, on 21 June.

2020–21 season: Loan to Fulham
On 5 October 2020, Loftus-Cheek was loaned to Fulham for the remainder of the season. He made his club debut on 18 October 2020, in a 1–1 away draw against Sheffield United after he came off from the bench. On 22 November, Loftus-Cheek scored his first Premier League goal for the club in a 2–3 home defeat against Everton.

International career

He received his first call-up to the England senior squad in November 2017. Following his first senior call-up, Loftus-Cheek went onto make his England debut during their friendly fixture against Germany, in which he featured for the full 90 minutes, winning man of the match after an impressive performance in the 0–0 draw.

On 16 May 2018, Loftus-Cheek was included in Gareth Southgate's 23-man squad for the 2018 FIFA World Cup. He came on as an 80th-minute substitute for Dele Alli in England's opening match, a 2–1 win over Tunisia on 18 June 2018.

Style of play
After his first-team debut, Barney Ronay of The Guardian described Loftus-Cheek as an "intriguing" player of "long-striding grace" saying that with his "shielding, covering, deep-playmaking presence with a calmness in possession and a naturally telescopic reach" he would be a good fit for the senior England national team. Loftus-Cheek was compared to Germany great Michael Ballack by former Chelsea and England manager Glenn Hoddle, who said that: "He reminds me of Ballack – physically and the way he plays", and went on to say: "He gets in the box and he moves well off the ball." Following his first Premier League start of the 2015–16 season, Loftus-Cheek's Chelsea manager, José Mourinho, commented "He [Loftus-Cheek] is brilliant with the ball. He doesn't look 19 – he looks solid, stable and mature. But without the ball he doesn't look as good tactically." Liam Twomey of FourFourTwo described Loftus-Cheek as "an imposing box-to-box midfielder who combines a muscular 6ft 3in frame that enables him to dominate physically with startlingly polished technique and composure," also noting that "[h]e rarely makes a bad decision on the ball," and labelling him a "rare blend of natural physique and refined skill," whom he likened to Paul Pogba.

Throughout his career, Loftus-Cheek has been playing either as a central or attacking midfielder, but former Chelsea manager Antonio Conte stated that he sees Loftus-Cheek with the potential of a striker since he has "good technique, good personality and he is good one vs one." However, under Thomas Tuchel and Graham Potter, Loftus-Cheek has played in other positions such as centre-back and wing-back. With the player saying that he's "enjoyed the challenge from (playing at) right wing-back, to centre-back to the No 6 role in midfield" under Tuchel.

Other ventures
In late 2019, Loftus-Cheek starred in Burberry's festive campaign. While talking about modeling for the British fashion house’s campaign, he said: "When the opportunity came knocking I couldn’t turn the experience down. Being injured at the time, it was a good way to use some of my free time."

Career statistics

Club

International

Honours
Chelsea Youth
FA Youth Cup: 2011–12, 2013–14
UEFA Youth League: 2014–15

Chelsea
Premier League: 2016–17
UEFA Europa League: 2018–19
UEFA Super Cup: 2021
FA Cup runner-up: 2021–22
EFL Cup runner-up: 2018–19, 2021–22

England U21
Toulon Tournament: 2016

Individual
Toulon Tournament Player of the Tournament: 2016

References

External links

Profile at the Chelsea F.C. website
Profile at the Football Association website

1996 births
Living people
Footballers from Lewisham
People from Swanley
Footballers from Kent
English footballers
Association football midfielders
Chelsea F.C. players
Crystal Palace F.C. players
Fulham F.C. players
Premier League players
England youth international footballers
England under-21 international footballers
England international footballers
2018 FIFA World Cup players
Black British sportsmen
English people of Guyanese descent
FA Cup Final players